Jarosław Piotr Araszkiewicz (born 1 February 1965 in Szamotuły) is a Polish football manager and former player.

Career

Club
He played as a striker or winger. He can be called football nomad as he had changed clubs 15 times during the course of his career. He played for such clubs as: Legia Warsaw, MSV Duisburg, Dyskobolia Grodzisk, but he is best known as an icon of Lech Poznań. Araszkiewicz won five Polish League Titles with Lech (1983, 1984, 1990, 1992, 1993 – five out of eight that Lech won in its history), the last title was somewhat controversial, as at the end of the season Legia Warsaw was at the top of the table, but due to corruption allegation the title was granted to Lech Poznań. Araszkiewicz also won with Lech twice the Polish Cup (1984, 1988). He began his professional career in Lech and returned later to Poznań. He played 176 matches and scored 40 goals for Lech.

National team
He played 12 times for Poland.

Managerial career
After retiring from the playing career he was still linked to Poznań and the surrounding area, he managed many local teams as well as those connected with Lech.

References

External links
 Jarosław Araszkiewicz at TFF.org
 

1965 births
Living people
Polish footballers
Poland international footballers
Polish expatriate footballers
Lech Poznań players
Bakırköyspor footballers
Legia Warsaw players
Pogoń Szczecin players
Dyskobolia Grodzisk Wielkopolski players
MSV Duisburg players
Maccabi Netanya F.C. players
Hakoah Maccabi Ramat Gan F.C. players
Süper Lig players
Ekstraklasa players
2. Bundesliga players
Sandecja Nowy Sącz managers
Kolejarz Stróże managers
Expatriate footballers in Israel
Expatriate footballers in Turkey
Polish football managers
Polish expatriate sportspeople in Turkey
People from Szamotuły
Aluminium Konin players
Sportspeople from Greater Poland Voivodeship
Association football midfielders
Olimpia Elbląg managers
Warta Poznań managers
Zagłębie Sosnowiec managers